Berry Aviation, Inc is an American charter airline with its headquarters based in San Marcos, Texas. It operates charters for the US Department of Defense in multiple locations worldwide and Part 135 On-Demand Cargo across North America and the Caribbean. It was founded in 1983.

Fleet 
The Berry Aviation fleet includes the following aircraft (as of December 2021):

The airline fleet previously included the following aircraft:
 3 further Dornier 328-100
 4 UH-72 Lakota Helicopters

2017 Niger terrorist incident 

On October 4, 2017, four U.S. Army personnel and five Nigerien soldiers were killed and two more injured after being ambushed while assisting local forces in Southwest Niger. It was later reported that private contractors working for Berry Aviation "conducted casualty evacuation and transport for U.S. and partner forces". Berry Aviation was described as having a "sole source bridge contract" in Niamey for duties including casualty evacuation.

2017 hurricane relief and pet evacuation flights 

Starting on August 28, 2017, Berry Aviation conducted over fifty flights for Wings of Rescue and the Humane Society of the United States, carrying over 100 tons of emergency supplies into the Hurricane Harvey, Irma and Maria zones and then flying over 4,500 pets, who otherwise would have died, to safety at no-kill animal shelters throughout the mainland United States.

Accidents and Incidents

References

External links 
Berry Aviation

Charter airlines of the United States
Airlines established in 1983
Airlines based in Texas
1983 establishments in Texas